The Dagestan Oblast was a province (oblast) of the Caucasus Viceroyalty of the Russian Empire. It roughly corresponded to most of present-day southeastern Dagestan within the Russian Federation. The Dagestan oblast was created in 1860 out of the territories of the former Caucasian Imamate, bordering the Terek Oblast to the north, the Tiflis Governorate and Zakatal Okrug to the west, the Elizavetpol Governorate to the south, and Baku Governorate to the east. The administrative center of the oblast was Temir-Khan-Shura (present-day Buynaksk).

Administrative divisions 
The districts (okrugs) of the Dagestan oblast in 1917 were as follows:

Demographics

Russian Empire Census 
The plurality of the population indicated Avar-Andean to be their mother tongue, with significant Dargin, Kyurin, Kazi-Kumukh, Kumyk, and Tatar speaking minorities.

Kavkazskiy kalendar 

Notes

References

Bibliography 

 
Caucasus Viceroyalty (1801–1917)
Oblasts of the Russian Empire
History of Dagestan
States and territories established in 1860
States and territories disestablished in 1917
1860 establishments in the Russian Empire
1917 disestablishments in Russia